B58 may refer to :

 HLA-B58, an HLA-B serotype
 Convair B-58 Hustler, an aircraft
 BMW B58, an engine